Get Along may refer to:

"Get Along" (Guy Sebastian song)
"Get Along" (Kenny Chesney song)
"Get Along", a song by Ou Est le Swimming Pool from The Golden Year
Get Along (video album), a live DVD by Tegan and Sara